Amata francisca is a moth of the family Erebidae. It was described by Arthur Gardiner Butler in 1876. It is found in the Republic of the Congo, Mozambique and Sierra Leone.

References

 Arctiidae genus list at Butterflies and Moths of the World of the Natural History Museum

francisca
Moths described in 1876
Moths of Sub-Saharan Africa